The 1983 European Formula Two season was contested over 12 rounds. 14 teams, 39 drivers, 10 chassis and 3 engines competed. Ralt driver Jonathan Palmer clinched the championship title.

Calendar

Note:

Race 11 originally scheduled over 48 laps, but shortened after a restart due to an accident in the first corner.

Final point standings

Drivers' Championship

 9 points to the winner, 6 for runner-up, 4 for third place, 3 for fourth place, 2 for fifth place and 1 for sixth place. The best 9 results count.

Complete Overview

R10=retired, but classified NC=not classified R=retired NS=did not start NQ=did not qualify DIS(3)=disqualified after finishing in third position

References

European Formula Two
European Formula Two Championship seasons